Kettenbrücke-Walzer (Chain Bridge Waltz), Op. 4, is a waltz composed by Johann Strauss in 1828.

The composition employed the instrumentation of one flute, two clarinets, two horns, timpani, three violins and double bass.

References

External links 

Compositions by Johann Strauss I